Professor Mercedes Maroto-Valer FRSE FRSC FIChemE FRSA FEI is Champion and Director of the UK Industrial Decarbonisation Research and Innovation Centre (IDRIC) focused on accelerating the transition to net zero of the UK largest industrial clusters and establishing the first world net-zero industrial cluster. Prof Maroto-Valer is Deputy Principal (Global Sustainability) at Heriot-Watt University, leading institutional and global changes in sustainability, making a significant impact on achieving the United Nations Sustainable Development Goals and working with partners to achieve global carbon reduction targets. She is also director of the Research Centre for Carbon Solutions (RCCS)  at Heriot-Watt University, where she holds the Robert Buchan Chair in Sustainable Energy Engineering. RCCS that is a world leading multidisciplinary centre delivering innovation for the wider deployment of low-carbon energy systems required for meeting net-zero targets. Her internationally recognised track record covers energy systems, CCUS carbon dioxide capture and storage,  integration of hydrogen technologies and low carbon fuels. Her work has been recognised through various prestigious awards and prizes, including the Philip Leverhulme Prize for Engineering in 2009.

Mercedes Maroto-Valer was elected as a fellow of the Royal Society of Edinburgh in 2015.

Awards 
Prof Maroto-Valer is Fellow Royal Society of Chemistry (FRSC, 2008), Fellow Institute of Chemical Engineers (FIChemE, 2013), Fellow Royal Society of Edinburgh (FRSE, 2015), Fellow Royal Society for the encouragement of Arts, Manufactures and Commerce (FRSA, 2016), Fellow Energy Institute (FEI, 2020).

She has received numerous international prizes and awards, including:

 2021 Disruptors + Innovators Best Research Project Prize recognising the work carried out to decarbonise energy, particularly in industrial sectors.
 2021 ACES-Margarita Salas Prize recognising the work carried out by researchers of Spanish nationality with renowned international impact, contributing to social progress in an exemplary and extraordinary way.
 2020 WES Top 50 Women in Engineering (WE50) Sustainability for exceptional attainments made in sustainability and shaping the world.
 2019 Scottish Women Award for services to science and technology.
 2019 IET Transport Innovation Award and 2019 IET Highly Commended Prize in Sustainability & Environmental Impact category (2019) for creating low carbon jet fuel through integration of novel technologies from co-valorisation of CO2 and biomass.
 2019 IET Highly Commended Prize in the Information Technology category for sustainable computing through innovative cooling and power generation.
 2019 Finalist British Airways: Future of Fuels challenge  for the development of sustainable fuels for future aviation.
 2019 Honorary Doctorate, Delft Technical University for global academic leadership in energy systems thinking and outstanding work on in low carbon energy systems, carbon capture and storage, and solar fuels.
 2018 SRUK/CERU Merit Award, Society of Spanish Researchers in the United Kingdom (SRUK/CERU) in recognition of the career of a senior Spanish researcher in the UK.
 Finalist 2017 IChemE Global Awards in recognition of the collaborative project focused on cutting energy consumption in the rapidly growing global data centre sector.
 Hong-Kong University Mong Distinguished Fellowship (2013) awarded by Hong-Kong University.
 2011 Royal Society of Chemistry: Environment, Sustainability and Energy Early Career Award for research in the field of carbon capture and storage.
 2009 Philip Leverhulme Prize for Engineering  
 2005 Award for Innovative Developments in Unburned Carbon on Fly Ash (2005) for exemplary achievement in engineering research and development presented by the United States Department of Energy, National Energy Technology Laboratory (NETL). 
 1996 R.A. Glenn Award to the best paper in the Fuel Chemistry Division of the American Chem. Soc. Meeting in Orlando for research in the effect of screening processes into the properties of coking coals for steel production.
 1997 Ritchie Prize for the best PhD dissertation of the Department of Chemistry of the University of Strathclyde.
 1993 ICI Chemical & Polymers Group Andersonian Centenary Prize to the best student in Applied Chemistry at Strathclyde University.

References 

Fellows of the Royal Society of Edinburgh
Living people
Year of birth missing (living people)